Stenopelmus is a genus of marsh weevils in the beetle family Brachyceridae. There are at least two described species in Stenopelmus.

Species
These two species belong to the genus Stenopelmus:
 Stenopelmus brunneus Hustache, 1926
 Stenopelmus rufinasus Gyllenhal, 1836 (water fern weevil)

References

Further reading

External links

 

Brachyceridae
Articles created by Qbugbot